Ramesh Kumar is an Indian wrestler, who the bronze medal in the Men's 74kg Freestyle Wrestling event at the 2009 Wrestling World Championship in Herning, Denmark.

Biography
He was born in Purkhas in Sonipat district of Haryana.

While still in school, his maternal grandfather who was also a wrestler sent him to Capt. Chand Roop& Chotu Ram ’s Akhada, a school of Indian-style wrestling, pehlwani, at Azadpur, Delhi, in 1994. In 1997, while still studying in ninth standard at the Jahangirpuri Government School, he won a gold medal, at the 11th World Cadet Wrestling Championships, after beating Russia's B Yusuf on points (6-3), in the 63-kg category.

At the 2002 Commonwealth Games, he won gold medal in 66 kg category.

In 2005, at the 51st National Championship, he beat Sombir of Haryana, in the 74 kg freestyle to win the finals. He represented India at the 2004 Summer Olympics in Men's Freestyle 66 kg category, though he missed 2008 Olympics due to back injury. After 2004, he switched to 74 kg category.

At the 2009 FILA Wrestling World Championships, he defeated Alexandr Burca of Moldova to win a bronze medal, which was India's first medal win at the championship, after  Vishambhar Singh won a silver in 1967, 42 years ago.

He lives and trains in Sonepat, Haryana.

References

External links
 Bronze medallist Ramesh Kumar says gold next time

Olympic wrestlers of India
Wrestlers at the 2004 Summer Olympics
Wrestlers at the 2002 Commonwealth Games
Indian male sport wrestlers
1981 births
Living people
People from Sonipat district
Sport wrestlers from Haryana
World Wrestling Championships medalists
Commonwealth Games gold medallists for India
Commonwealth Games medallists in wrestling
Recipients of the Arjuna Award
Asian Wrestling Championships medalists
20th-century Indian people
21st-century Indian people
Medallists at the 2002 Commonwealth Games